Stanley B. Glover (April 18, 1908 – February 23, 1964) was a Canadian athlete who competed in the 1928 Summer Olympics.

He was born in Newcastle-upon-Tyne.

Glover competed for Canada in the 1928 Olympics held in Amsterdam, Netherlands in the 4×400 metre relay where he won the bronze medal with his teammates Alex Wilson, Phil Edwards and Jimmy Ball.

At 1930 Empire Games he won the silver medal with the Canadian team in the 4×440 yards relay event. In the 440 yards competition he was eliminated in the heats.

References
Stanley Glover's profile at Sports Reference.com

1908 births
1964 deaths
English emigrants to Canada
Sportspeople from Newcastle upon Tyne
Canadian male sprinters
Olympic track and field athletes of Canada
Athletes (track and field) at the 1928 Summer Olympics
Olympic bronze medalists for Canada
Athletes (track and field) at the 1930 British Empire Games
Commonwealth Games silver medallists for Canada
Commonwealth Games medallists in athletics
Medalists at the 1928 Summer Olympics
Olympic bronze medalists in athletics (track and field)
Medallists at the 1930 British Empire Games